Narciso Soldan (11 December 1927, Nervesa della Battaglia, Veneto – 30 July 1987, Conegliano, Veneto) was an Italian professional footballer who played as a goalkeeper in the Italian Football League.

Career

Soldan began his playing career at the very late age of 19, having never previously kicked a ball. One day, while attending a local club match at Vittorio Veneto, he became fascinated by the goalkeeper's role on the playing field. At the end of the match he went onto the pitch, along with some friends, and had them take some shots at him. The team's coach, Enrico Colombari, approached Soldan and an agreement was made whereby Soldan signed his first professional football contract with Vittorio Veneto for the 1946–47 season. For the remainder of the season, he was loaned out to his local team, F.C. Nervesa, to gain some experience and match practice.

The following year (1947–48), Narciso Soldan was playing in Italy's third division: Serie C - North League: Group H. After a fantastic season, Vittorio Veneto arrived in 3rd place and just missed promotion to the "New" Serie C.

The 1948–49 season didn't go as well for Vittorio Veneto as the previous one had. The club was now playing in the new, recently named Promozione Interregionale - 4th Division: Group E. The team struggled for long periods throughout the season but managed to finish in a respectable 10th position. On the one hand while the team wasn't performing so well, for Narciso Soldan, it became the turning point in his career. After having a great season defending his goal, coach Enrico Colombari decided to try his luck by taking young Soldan for trials in Milan under the watchful eyes of Giulio Cappelli, then Manager of F.C. Internazionale Milano. Soldan spent two seasons with Inter in Serie A, before moving to Catania in Serie B in 1951, where he took part in the club's 4–1 defeat to Legnano in the Serie A promotion play-offs during his second season. He subsequently played for Torino and Triestina in Serie A.

He returned to play in Milan during the 1956–57 Serie A season, but to join Inter's cross-city rivals A.C. Milan. Despite competition from Lorenzo Buffon, he managed to win two league titles during his time with the club, and also reached the 1958 European Cup Final, only to be defeated 3–2 by Real Madrid in extra-time. During the 1959–60 season, he joined Torino F.C. in Serie B and helped the team win the second division title to obtain Serie A promotion; after two seasons with the Turin club, he ended his career with Treviso in Serie C in 1962.

Career statistics

Club

Honours
Milan
Serie A: 1956–57, 1958–59

Torino
Serie B: 1959–60

References

External links
Narciso Soldan Profile at magliarossonera.it

1927 births
1987 deaths
Sportspeople from the Province of Treviso
Italian footballers
Association football goalkeepers
Serie A players
Inter Milan players
Footballers from Veneto